York—Peel was a federal electoral district represented in the House of Commons of Canada from 1979 to 1988. It was located in the province of Ontario. This riding was created in 1976 from parts of Peel—Dufferin—Simcoe, York North and York—Simcoe ridings. It was represented in the House of Commons by Sinclair Stevens of the Progressive Conservative Party during its whole existence.

York—Peel consisted of the Town of Caledon in Peel Region, and the Townships of East Gwillimbury and King and the Towns of Aurora, Newmarket and Whitchurch–Stouffville in York Region.

The electoral district was abolished in 1987 when it was re-distributed between Halton—Peel, Markham, York North and York—Simcoe ridings.

Members of Parliament

This riding has elected the following Members of Parliament:

Election results

|-

|Progressive Conservative
|Sinclair Stevens
|align="right"|29,081

|Liberal
|Richard Whitehead
|align="right"|14,108

|New Democratic
|Wally Gustar
|align="right"|7,725

|}

|-

|Progressive Conservative
|Sinclair Stevens
|align="right"| 23,955

|Liberal
|Wally Harkness
|align="right"|17,303

|New Democratic
|John Hall
|align="right"|8,708

|}

|-

|Progressive Conservative
|Sinclair Stevens
|align="right"|37,493

|Liberal
|Pam McPherson
|align="right"|12,538

|New Democratic
| John Hall
|align="right"|9,353

|Independent
|Ray Pritchard
|align="right"|480

|}

See also
 List of Canadian federal electoral districts
 Past Canadian electoral districts

External links
 Website of the Parliament of Canada

Former federal electoral districts of Ontario
Aurora, Ontario
Politics of King, Ontario
Newmarket, Ontario
Whitchurch-Stouffville